The 2004 World Junior Championships in Athletics were held in Grosseto, Italy on 12–18 July.

Results

Men

Women

Medal table

Participation
According to an unofficial count through an unofficial result list, 1261 athletes from 168 countries participated in the event.  This is in agreement with the official numbers as published.

References

IAAF World Junior Championships. GBR Athletics. Retrieved on 2010-06-06.

External links
Official site (archive)

 
2004
World Junior Championships in Athletics
Athletics
International athletics competitions hosted by Italy